Instrumental Asylum is an EP by Manfred Mann, released in 1966. The EP is a 7-inch vinyl record and released in mono with the catalogue number His Master's Voice-EMI 7EG 8949.

Background

The band recorded this as they were in the process of re-organizing. All the songs chosen were covers of current relatively well known pop and rock songs, The Yardbirds' "Still I'm Sad" being the most obscure. Mike Vickers had left and been replaced on guitar by bassist Tom McGuinness, who in turn was replaced on bass by Jack Bruce. Horn players Henry Lowther and Lyn Dobson took over the lead spot from singer Paul Jones, who was soon to quit the band. There is little evidence of Jones on the record. As with most of their other records, both albums and EPs of this era, the liner notes were written by Manfred Mann member Tom McGuinness.

Track listing

Side 1

 "Still I'm Sad" (Paul Samwell-Smith)
 "My Generation" (Pete Townshend)

Side 2

 "(I Can't Get No) Satisfaction" (Mick Jagger, Keith Richards)
 "I Got You Babe" (Sonny Bono)

Personnel

 Manfred Mann – keyboards
 Henry Lowther – trumpet and flute
 Lyn Dobson – saxophone
 Paul Jones – harmonica
 Tom McGuinness – guitar
 Jack Bruce – bass guitar
 Mike Hugg – drums and vibes

Chart performance

This EP was the band's least successful effort since their initial EP release, Cock-a-Hoop in 1964. It reached # 3 in the British EP charts.

References

 liner notes
 http://anorakthing.blogspot.com/2009/05/manfred-mann-jazzbos.html
Footnotes

See also

Instrumental Assassination
Soul of Mann

1966 EPs
EMI Records EPs
Manfred Mann EPs
His Master's Voice EPs